Zermatt GGB railway station is a railway station in the municipality of Zermatt, in the Swiss canton of Valais. It is the northern terminus of  Gornergrat Railway and is served by local trains only. The station is across the street from Zermatt railway station, the southern terminus of the Matterhorn Gotthard Bahn's Brig–Zermatt line.

Services 
The following services stop at Zermatt GGB:

References

External links 
 
 

Railway stations in the canton of Valais
Gornergrat Railway stations
Transport in Zermatt